The Bays railway station is a proposed station on the Sydney Metro West that will serve the Bays Precinct. It is to be built between Glebe Island and White Bay Power Station and is scheduled to open with the rest of the line by 2030.

References

External links
The Bays Metro station Sydney Metro

Proposed Sydney Metro stations
Railway stations scheduled to open in 2030